"Talk" is a song performed by American boy band Why Don't We. The song was released as a digital download on July 6, 2018, by Signature and Atlantic Records as the second single from their debut studio album 8 Letters. The song peaked at number eighteen on the US Bubbling Under Hot 100 Singles chart.

Music video
A music video to accompany the release of "Talk" was first released onto YouTube on July 7, 2018. The video was directed by Éli Sokhn and was filmed across Europe while the band were on the while on the European leg of their Invitation Tour.

Personnel
Credits adapted from Tidal. 
 Louis Schoorl – Producer, background vocals, bass, guitar, keyboards, programmer, recorded by, writer
 Celle Lehmann – Background Vocals, guitar
 Why Don't We – Background Vocals
 Chris Gehringer – Mastering Engineer
 Serban Ghenea – Mixing Engineer
 Ariel Chobaz – Recording Engineer
 Corbyn Besson – Vocals
 Daniel Seavey – Vocals
 Jack Avery – Vocals
 Jonah Marais – Vocals
 Zach Herron – Vocals
 Carl Lehmann – Writer
 Hayley Gene Penner – Writer

Charts

Release history

References

2018 songs
2018 singles
Why Don't We songs